Lynwood Rowe Lundquist (November 3, 1934 – April 9, 2013) was an American politician and businessman.

Lundquist graduated from Oregon State University and received his masters from University of Connecticut. He also served in the United States Army. Lundquist served in the Oregon House of Representatives 1994-1998 as a Republican. From 1997 to 1998, he served as Speaker of the Oregon House of Representatives. After his term, Lundquist headed the Oregon Business Association and retired in 2007.

Notes

External links
Lynn Lundquist remembered as an Oregon political, business icon
Local lawmaker Lynn Lundquist dead at 78

1934 births
2013 deaths
Oregon State University alumni
University of Connecticut alumni
Speakers of the Oregon House of Representatives
Republican Party members of the Oregon House of Representatives
Businesspeople from Oregon
People from Powell Butte, Oregon
George Fox University faculty
20th-century American businesspeople